Omaha Township may refer to:

 Omaha Township, Boone County, Arkansas
 Omaha Township, Gallatin County, Illinois
 Omaha Township, Thurston County, Nebraska

Township name disambiguation pages